Shirly Karvinen (born 3 September 1992) is a Finnish model and beauty pageant titleholder. She was crowned Miss Finland 2016 and represented her country at Miss Universe 2016.

Background
Karvinen was born to a Finnish father and a Chinese mother in Finland. Due to her father's work in an asphalt paving company, she spent her early childhood living in Zambia, Kenya, Tanzania, and Saudi Arabia. In her teens, she also lived in Beijing as an exchange student, while spending time with her mother's side of the family.

Karvinen speaks Finnish and English. She also knows the basics of Mandarin Chinese.

Education and career
Karvinen has most recently studied in the Bachelor of Business Administration program at Haaga-Helia University of Applied Sciences in Helsinki. As part of her studies, she also worked as an administrative assistant in the Ministry for Foreign Affairs in Helsinki and the Embassy of Finland in Washington, D.C.

Pageantry

Miss Finland 2016
Karvinen was crowned Miss Finland 2016 at Vanajanlinna Castle in Hämeenlinna on May 13, 2016.

As Miss Finland, Karvinen wants to be a good role model for others to look up to. Among her other causes, Karvinen has supported anti-bullying efforts and spoke against school bullying. She herself suffered from bullying in her childhood and youth due to the fact she is half Chinese.

Miss Universe 2016
Karvinen represented Finland at Miss Universe 2016 but unplaced.

Private life
Karvinen lives together with her girlfriend, Finnish pop singer Sanni in Helsinki, Finland.

References

External links
Official Miss Finland Website

1993 births
Living people
Miss Universe 2016 contestants
People from Jyväskylä
Miss Finland winners
Finnish people of Chinese descent